Joanna Hogg (born 20 March 1960) is a British film director and screenwriter. She made her directorial and screenwriting feature film debut in 2007 with Unrelated followed by Archipelago (2010), Exhibition (2013), The Souvenir (2019), The Souvenir Part II (2021), and The Eternal Daughter (2022). Two of her films topped the Sight & Sound annual poll for best film in their respective years, receiving nominations at the British Independent Film Awards, the Independent Spirit Awards and at the Berlin International Film Festival.

Career

Early TV work
After leaving school in the late 1970s, Hogg worked as a photographer and began to make experimental super-8 films after borrowing a camera from Derek Jarman, who became an early mentor after a chance meeting in Patisserie Valerie in Soho. One of these, a film about a kinetic sculpture by artist Ron Haselden, won her a place to study direction at the National Film and Television School. In 1986, her graduation piece called Caprice starred Tilda Swinton. On graduation, Hogg directed several music videos for artists such as Alison Moyet, and won her first television commission writing and directing a programme segment for Janet Street Porter's Channel Four series Network 7, Flesh + Blood. In the 1990s, Hogg directed episodes of London Bridge, Casualty and London's Burning. She also directed the EastEnders special EastEnders: Dot's Story (2003).

Film
Hogg has said, "I wanted to make a film doing everything I was told not to do in television". She shot her first feature, Unrelated (2007), in Tuscany. It tells the story of a childless woman, Anna (Kathryn Worth), of around forty who goes on holiday to Italy with her friend Verena (Mary Roscoe) and her teenage family. Over the course of the holiday, tensions emerge as Anna spends less time with the 'grown-ups' and is drawn towards the teenage crowd and the attractions of Verena's teenage nephew (Tom Hiddleston). The film received critical acclaim, premiering at the London Film Festival in 2007 and winning the FIPRESCI International Critics Award. It also won the Guardian First Film Award in 2008 and the Evening Standard British Film Awards 'Most Promising Newcomer' Award in 2009, as well as being nominated for their Best Film Award and earning Hogg a nomination for the London Film Critics' Circle 'Breakthrough Filmmaker' Award in 2009.

Her second film, Archipelago, shot on the island of Tresco had its UK premiere at the 2010 London Film Festival, where it was nominated in the Best Film category. It was released in the UK on 4 March 2011 by Artificial Eye. Her third film Exhibition starred musician Viv Albertine and artist Liam Gillick and also featured Hogg's long-time collaborator Tom Hiddleston. The film premiered at the Locarno Film Festival in 2013. Peter Bradshaw writing in The Guardian hailed it as 'a masterful cinematic enigma' awarding it the full five stars.

In the A24 podcast episode "A Bigger Canvas", Martin Scorsese has a conversation with Hogg where it is revealed that he saw her film Archipelago and reached out to her wanting to collaborate with her. He served as an executive producer for her next film, The Souvenir (2019). The film premiered in the Sundance Film Festival. It was released in the United States on 17 May 2019 by A24 and in the United Kingdom on 30 August 2019 by Curzon Artificial Eye. The title refers to the painting of the same name by Jean-Honoré Fragonard and Hogg's personal life, with the performance of Honor Swinton Byrne, Tom Burke and Tilda Swinton. The film was nominated in several film awards ceremonies and festivals, including the Berlin International Film Festival, the British Independent Film Awards and the Independent Spirit Awards.

The sequel, The Souvenir Part II, had its premier at Cannes Film Festival in July 2021, receiving critical acclaim, with nominations at the British Independent Film Awards, the Gotham Awards and at the London Film Critics' Circle.

Hogg's newest film, The Eternal Daughter, is a mystery-drama film starring Tilda Swinton. The film is set to premier at the 2022 Venice Film Festival.

Radio
In 2015 Hogg directed Harold Pinter's unproduced film screenplay adaptation of the short story by Karen Blixen "The Dreaming Child" for Radio 4, adapting the screenplay with producer Laurence Bowen. It starred Lydia Leonard, who worked with Hogg on Archipelago and Bertie Carvel.

Gallery curation 
In October 2015 Hogg co-curated the retrospective exhibition of film maker Chantal Akerman's installation work, "Chantal Akerman NOW", at the Ambika P3 Gallery. This was the culmination of a two-year-long retrospective of Akerman's work she had programmed with Adam Roberts, with whom she founded the cinema collective A Nos Amours in 2011. The collective is "dedicated to programming over-looked, under-exposed or especially potent cinema". In an interview, Hogg said that 'A new generation is growing up who actually don't know the work of directors like Tarkovsky', as a major motivation behind establishing the collective.

Influences and style 
Hogg's style is influenced by European and Asian directors such as Eric Rohmer and Yasujirō Ozu, using extended takes and minimal camera movement. She takes the unusual approach of casting a mixture of actors and non-professional actors in her films, such as the landscape painter Christopher Baker in Archipelago. Her depiction of unarguably middle-class characters has prompted some commentators to see her work as spearheading a new type of social realism in British film.

In an interview with Vogue in 2021, Hogg mentioned women directors Chloe Zhao and Mia Hansen-Løve as two friends and inspirations for her productions.

Filmography

Film

Television 
 Flesh + Blood (miniseries for Network 7) Channel Four (1988)
 Kersplat (six episodes) Channel Four (1991)
 Dance Eight BBC (1992)
 Going Underground Carlton Television (1992)
 Oasis (10-part drama) Carlton Television (1992)
 London Bridge Carlton Television (16 episodes 1995–1996)
 Staying Alive (two episodes) LWT (1997)
 Casualty BBC (1997–1998)
 London's Burning LWT (1999)
 Reach for the Moon (three episodes) LWT (2000)
 EastEnders: Dot's Story BBC (2003)

Awards and nominations

References

External links

 

1960 births
English film directors
English screenwriters
English women film directors
Living people
Writers from London
WFTV Award winners
Alumni of the National Film and Television School
Sundance Film Festival award winners